Geoff Gosper (born 11 May 1940) is a former Australian rules footballer who played for Essendon in the VFL during the 1960s.

Gosper played mostly as a half forward flanker and was recruited to Essendon from Strathmore. He was a reserve in Essendon's 1962 premiership side and on a half forward flank in their 1965 flag.

External links
 

1940 births
Australian rules footballers from Victoria (Australia)
Essendon Football Club players
Essendon Football Club Premiership players
Waverley Football Club players
Strathmore Football Club players
Living people
Two-time VFL/AFL Premiership players